Marcel Benger (born 2 July 1998) is a German professional footballer who plays as a defender for Holstein Kiel.

References

External links
 

1998 births
Living people
Sportspeople from Krefeld
Footballers from North Rhine-Westphalia
German footballers
Association football defenders
Borussia Mönchengladbach II players
Borussia Mönchengladbach players
Holstein Kiel players
Holstein Kiel II players
Bundesliga players
2. Bundesliga players
Regionalliga players
21st-century German people